Thomas Ognibene (December 12, 1943 – October 12, 2015) was an attorney and Republican politician in New York City who served in the New York City Council from 1992 to 2001.

Biography
Ognibene was first elected in 1992 to become a New York City Council member, where he served through 2001, representing the 30th District in Queens, including the neighborhoods of Middle Village, Glendale, Ridgewood, Richmond Hill, Woodhaven and Forest Hills.  Initially blocked by then Republican Mayor Rudy Giuliani, he was eventually elected as the Council Minority Leader and served in that position from 1994 until 2001.

In the 1980s, Mr. Ognibene ran unsuccessfully as a Conservative Party candidate for judgeships in Supreme and Civil Courts and for Congress.  Later changing to the Republican Party, he successfully ran for Council and then in a rebuff to Giuliani, he helped to engineer the controversial takeover of the Queens County Republican Party and have his favored candidate elected as Chairman  

His term in office was marred by allegations that surfaced in the Village Voice, and confirmed by the Manhattan District Attorney in the New York Times  that Ognibene and his Chief of Staff were caught on multiple wiretaps with a New York City Department of Buildings official Ronald Lattanzio discussing questionable "pay to play" influence peddling, inside appointments and improperly securing large grants from New York State officials for friends.  Though never formally charged, the allegations were widely believed to have derailed Ognibene's desired appointment to a judgeship on the New York Court of Claims that was already approved by the administration of Governor of New York George Pataki

In 2005 Ognibene unsuccessfully ran for mayor of New York City against incumbent Mayor Michael Bloomberg in the 2005 mayoral election.  Ognibene was endorsed by the leaders of the Queens County Republican Party to run in the Republican Party's primary election. However, Bloomberg's campaign successfully challenged enough of the signatures Ognibene had submitted to the Board of Elections to prevent Ognibene from appearing on ballots for the Republican primary. Instead, Ognibene ran only on the Conservative Party ticket.  Ognibene's campaign sought to beat Bloomberg by calling attention to Bloomberg's reputation as a "Republican In Name Only".

After a fallout with the Queens Republican leadership, Ognibene ran as a City Council candidate in a special election on June 3, 2008 for the seat he previously occupied where he came in third, losing to the Queens County Republican Party endorsed candidate Anthony Como and the Democratic County candidate Elizabeth Crowley.

Ognibene was chosen as Buffalo developer Carl Paladino's running mate in the New York gubernatorial election, 2010. He secured a spot on the November ballot on the Taxpayers Party line only to be removed later to avoid a split ticket, and he petitioned his way onto the Republican primary for Lieutenant Governor where he ran against the party's designee, Greg Edwards, the County Executive in Chautauqua County, in western New York.  Ognibene lost on September 14, 2010 in what had been a bitter primary.

Personal life
Originally from Middle Village in Queens, Ognibene graduated from C.W. Post College in 1966, served in the United States Army from 1967 to 1970 and graduated from Brooklyn Law School in 1974. He was a resident of Queens and was married for 48 years to his wife Margaret who survives him, a former New York City junior high school teacher. He has two children, Guy and Eve. Ognibene died of cancer on October 12, 2015 at the age of 71.

References

External links
Gotham Gazette 2005 webpage

|-

 
 

1943 births
2015 deaths
New York City Council members
Brooklyn Law School alumni
LIU Post alumni
New York (state) Republicans
New York (state) lawyers
20th-century American lawyers
20th-century American politicians
Deaths from cancer in New York (state)
Candidates in the 2010 United States elections